The Miombo woodland is a tropical and subtropical grasslands, savannas, and shrublands biome (in the World Wide Fund for Nature scheme) located primarily in Central Africa. It includes four woodland savanna ecoregions (listed below) characterized by the dominant presence of Brachystegia and Julbernardia species of trees, and has a range of climates ranging from humid to semi-arid, and tropical to subtropical or even temperate. The trees characteristically shed their leaves for a short period in the dry season to reduce water loss and produce a flush of new leaves just before the onset of the wet season with rich gold and red colours masking the underlying chlorophyll, reminiscent of autumn colours in the temperate zone.

The woodland gets its name from miombo (plural, singular muombo), the Bemba word for Brachystegia species. Other Bantu languages of the region, such as Swahili and Shona, have related if not identical words, such as Swahili miyombo (singular myombo).

Ecoregions
Miombo woodlands form a broad belt across south-central Africa, running from Angola in the west to Tanzania in the east. These woodlands are dominated by trees of subfamily Caesalpinioideae, particularly miombo (Brachystegia), Julbernardia and Isoberlinia, which are rarely found outside miombo woodlands. The four ecoregions are:

Angolan miombo woodlands (Angola)
Central Zambezian miombo woodlands (Angola, Burundi, Democratic Republic of the Congo, Malawi, Tanzania, Zambia)
Eastern miombo woodlands (Mozambique, Tanzania)
Southern miombo woodlands (Malawi, Mozambique, southern Zambia, Zimbabwe)

Miombo woodlands can be classified as dry or wet based on the per annum amount and distribution of rainfall. Dry woodlands occur in those areas receiving less than 1000 mm annual rainfall, mostly in Zimbabwe, central Tanzania and southern areas of Mozambique, Malawi and Zambia. Wet woodlands are those receiving more than 1000 mm annual rainfall, mainly located in northern Zambia, eastern Angola, central Malawi and southwestern Tanzania.

People
The miombo woodlands are important to the livelihoods of many rural people who depend on the resources available from the woodland. The wide variety of species provides non-timber products such as fruits, honey, fodder for livestock and fuelwood.

Flora and fauna

Despite the relatively nutrient-poor soil, long dry season, and low rainfall in some areas, the woodland is home to many species, including several endemic bird species. The predominant tree is miombo (Brachystegia spp.). It also provides food and cover for mammals such as the African elephant (Loxodonta africana), African wild dog (Lycaon pictus), sable antelope (Hippotragus niger) and Lichtenstein's hartebeest (Sigmoceros lichtensteinii).

Notes

References
Campbell, Bruce M., ed. 1996. The Miombo Transition: Woodlands & Welfare in Africa, CIFOR,

External links

  Earthtrends.wri.org: Map of Miombo forests-grasslands-drylands

 
Ecoregions of Africa
Tropical and subtropical grasslands, savannas, and shrublands
Grasslands of Africa
Ecoregions of Angola
Ecoregions of Burundi
Ecoregions of the Democratic Republic of the Congo
Ecoregions of Malawi
Ecoregions of Mozambique
Ecoregions of Tanzania
Ecoregions of Zambia
Ecoregions of Zimbabwe
Swahili words and phrases
Afrotropical realm biota
Afrotropical ecoregions
Zambezian region